William Hoffman Keister (August 17, 1871 – August 19, 1924) was a professional baseball player who played infielder and outfielder in the Major Leagues from 1896 to 1903. He would play for the Baltimore Orioles (NL), Boston Beaneaters, St. Louis Cardinals, Baltimore Orioles (AL), Washington Senators, and Philadelphia Phillies. In the five full seasons that he played, each of the teams that Keister played for finished last in the league for double plays.

In 621 games over seven seasons, Keister posted a .312 batting average (758-for-2433) with 400 runs, 133 doubles, 63 triples, 18 home runs, 400 RBI, 131 stolen bases, .349 on-base percentage and .440 slugging percentage.

See also
List of Major League Baseball annual triples leaders

References

External links

1871 births
1924 deaths
Major League Baseball second basemen
Major League Baseball shortstops
Baseball players from Baltimore
Baltimore Orioles (NL) players
Boston Beaneaters players
Baltimore Orioles (1901–02) players
St. Louis Cardinals players
Washington Senators (1901–1960) players
Philadelphia Phillies players
19th-century baseball players
New Haven Texas Steers players
Scranton Miners players
Paterson Silk Weavers players
Rochester Patriots players
Ottawa Wanderers players
Jersey City Skeeters players
Buffalo Bisons (minor league) players
Wilkes-Barre Barons (baseball) players
Williamsport Millionaires players